Zahořany may refer to:
Zahořany (Domažlice District)
Zahořany (Prague-West District)